Anaxeton is a genus of flowering plants in the family Asteraceae.

Species

References

Sources

Bibliography

Gnaphalieae
Asteraceae genera
Flora of the Cape Provinces
Endemic flora of South Africa